Agiortia is a small  genus of flowering plants in the family Ericaceae.

They are native to New South Wales and Queensland in Australia.

There are three species as follows:
Agiortia cicatricata  (J.M.Powell) Quinn syn. Leucopogon cicatricatus
Agiortia pedicellata  (C.T.White) Quinn syn. Leucopogon pedicellatus
Agiortia pleiosperma  (F.Muell.) Quinn syn. Leucopogon pleiospermus

The genus is closely related to Leucopogon.

The genus name of Agiortia is in honour of Despina (Fanias) Agioritis (1927–1994), an Australian botanist from Innisfail, Queensland. 
It was first described and published in Austral. Syst. Bot. Vol.18 on page 450 in 2005.

References

Epacridoideae
Ericaceae genera
Plants described in 2005
Flora of New South Wales
Flora of Queensland